Serena Vitale (born 10 July 1945 Brindisi) is an Italian academic, scholar, writer, and  translator. She won the 2001 Bagutta Prize.

Life 
In 1958, she moved to Rome with her family. She was married to the poet Giovanni Raboni. In 2003 she married Vladimír Novák. She is a Professor of Russian language and literature; she taught at the Università degli Studi di Napoli "L'Orientale", and the Università Cattolica del Sacro Cuore from 1971 to 2015.

Works 
 Pushkin's Button Adelphi, Milan 1995  
 Shklovsky: Witness to an Era  Editori Reuniti , Rome 1979

References 

1945 births
living people